Winter is a village in Sawyer County, Wisconsin, United States. The population was 233 at the 2010 census. The village is within the Town of Winter.

History
Winter was founded in 1904. It was named for W. C. Winter, a railroad official. A post office has been in operation in Winter since 1904.

Geography

Winter is located at  (45.821014, -91.011118).

Climate

Demographics

2010 census
At the 2010 census there were 313 people, 153 households, and 75 families living in the village. The racial makup of the village was 91.7% White, 1.3% African American, 1.3% Native American, 0.3% Asian, 1.0% from other races, and 4.5% from two or more races. Hispanic or Latino of any race were 5.1%.

Of the 153 households 26.8% had children under the age of 18 living with them, 29.4% were married couples living together, 12.4% had a female householder with no husband present, 7.2% had a male householder with no wife present, and 51.0% were non-families. 43.1% of households were one person and 22.3% were one person aged 65 or older. The average household size was 2.05 and the average family size was 2.87.

The median age in the village was 41.6 years. 25.6% of residents were under the age of 18; 5.5% were between the ages of 18 and 24; 22.7% were from 25 to 44; 25.2% were from 45 to 64; and 21.1% were 65 or older. The gender makeup of the village was 51.4% male and 48.6% female.

2000 census
At the 2000 census there were 344 people, 164 households, and 83 families living in the village. The 2010 Census revealed the population to be 233 - a nearly 1/3 decline since 2000. The population density was 430.9 people per square mile (166.0/km). There were 200 housing units at an average density of 250.5 per square mile (96.5/km).  The racial makup of the village was 96.51% White, 0.58% Black or African American, 2.03% Native American, 0.29% from other races, and 0.58% from two or more races. 1.45%. were Hispanic or Latino of any race.

Of the 164 households 26.8% had children under the age of 18 living with them, 37.2% were married couples living together, 10.4% had a female householder with no husband present, and 48.8% were non-families. 44.5% of households were one person and 23.2% were one person aged 65 or older. The average household size was 2.10 and the average family size was 2.92.

The age distribution was 24.1% under the age of 18, 6.7% from 18 to 24, 24.7% from 25 to 44, 20.9% from 45 to 64, and 23.5% 65 or older. The median age was 40 years. For every 100 females, there were 111.0 males. For every 100 females age 18 and over, there were 102.3 males.

The median household income was $22,955 and the median family income  was $25,625. Males had a median income of $23,333 versus $15,000 for females. The per capita income for the village was $15,404. About 13.2% of families and 17.5% of the population were below the poverty line, including 15.4% of those under age 18 and 25.0% of those age 65 or over.

Notable residents
Jeffrey Williams, astronaut, was raised in Winter

References

External links

 Winter School District
 Winter Area Chamber of Commerce

Villages in Sawyer County, Wisconsin
Villages in Wisconsin